Tadpole Computer was a manufacturer of rugged, military specification, UNIX workstations, thin client laptops and lightweight servers.

History
Tadpole was founded in 1994 and originally based in Cambridge, England, then for a time in Cupertino, California.

In 1998, Tadpole acquired RDI Computer Corporation of Carlsbad, California, who produced the competing Britelite and Powerlite portable SPARC-based systems, for $6 million.

Tadpole was later acquired by defense contractor General Dynamics, in April 2005.

Production continued until March 2013 but since then, they no longer sell any systems; and support for their products is provided by Flextronics.

An anonymous US intelligence officer had stated to Reuters in 2013 that a decade earlier the US secretly created a company reselling laptops from Tadpole Computer to Asian governments. The reseller added secret software that allowed intelligence analysts to access the machines remotely.

Products
Tadpole laptops used a variety of architectures, such as SPARC, Alpha, PowerPC and x86. Although very expensive, these classic Tadpoles won favour as a method to show corporation's proprietary software (IBM/HP/DEC) on a self-contained portable device on a client site in the days before remote connectivity.

SPARC

The original SPARCbook 1 was introduced in 1992 with 8–32 MB RAM and a 25 MHz processor. It was followed by several further SPARCbooks, UltraSPARCbooks (branded as Ultrabooks) - and the Voyager IIi. These all ran the SunOS or Solaris operating systems. In 2004, Tadpole released the Viper laptop.

The SPARCLE was based on a 500-600 MHz UltraSPARC IIe or 1 GHz UltraSPARC IIIi.

DEC Alpha

An Alpha-based laptop, the ALPHAbook 1, was announced on 4 December 1995 and became available in 1996. The Alphabook 1 was manufactured in Cambridge, England. It used an Alpha 21066A microprocessor specified for a maximum clock frequency of 233 MHz. The laptop used the OpenVMS operating system.

IBM PowerPC

A PowerPC-based laptop was also produced - the IBM RISC System/6000 N40 Notebook Workstation, powered by a 50 MHz PowerPC 601 and with between 16 and 64MB RAM - and designed to run IBM AIX.

x86
Tadpole also produced a range of x86-based notebook computers, including the Tadpole P1000, and the TALIN laptops with SUSE Linux, or optionally Microsoft Windows.

See also

 Military computers
 RDI PowerLite
 Toughbook, Panasonic's rugged portable computers

External links 

 www.tadpolecomputer.com on the Internet Archive
SPARCbook 3000ST - The coolest 90s laptop

References

1994 establishments in California
2005 disestablishments in California
American companies established in 1994
American companies disestablished in 2005
Computer companies established in 1994
Computer companies disestablished in 2005
Defunct computer companies of the United Kingdom
Defunct computer companies of the United States
Defunct computer hardware companies
SPARC microprocessor products